The  Dortmund Grand Prix (formerly known as Grosser Preis der Wirtschaft) is a Group 3 flat horse race in Germany open to thoroughbreds aged three years or older. It is run at Dortmund over a distance of 2,000 metres (about 1¼ miles), and it is scheduled to take place each year in June.

History
The event was established in 1968, and it was originally called the Grosser Preis von Dortmund. It was initially contested over 2,200 metres. Its distance was frequently modified during the 1970s.

The race began a period over 1,800 metres in 1981, and a new length of 1,750 metres was introduced in 1998. It was extended to 2,000 metres in 2008 but return to 1,750 meters in 2013

Records
Most successful horse (2 wins):
 Wladimir – 1975, 1976
 Kamiros – 1987, 1988
 Banyumanik – 2000, 2001
 War Blade – 2002, 2003
 Potemkin – 2016, 2019

Leading jockey (9 wins):
 Andrasch Starke – Devil River Peek (1996), War Blade (2003), Lord of England (2006), Soldier Hollow (2007), Norderney (2010), Elle Shadow (2011), All Shamar (2012), Neatico (2013), Liberty London (2021)

Leading trainer (6 wins):
 Heinz Jentzsch – Priamos (1968), Sarto (1972), Experte (1973), Honduras (1974), Aguarico (1986), Zampano (1989)

Winners

 Illo finished first in 2010, but he was relegated to third place following a stewards' inquiry.

See also
 List of German flat horse races
 Recurring sporting events established in 1968 – this race is included under its original title, Grosser Preis von Dortmund.

References
 Racing Post:
 galopp-sieger.de – Großer Preis der Dortmunder Industrie und Wirtschaft.
 horseracingintfed.com – International Federation of Horseracing Authorities – Grosser Preis der Wirtschaft (2012).
 pedigreequery.com – Grosser Preis der Dortmunder Wirtschaft – Dortmund.

Open middle distance horse races
Horse races in Germany